Yakov Vladimirovich Flier (1912 – December 18, 1977; last name also spelled Fliere or Fliyer) was a Jewish Russian concert pianist and teacher.

Flier was born in Orekhovo-Zuyevo, Russia. He studied piano at the Moscow Conservatory with Konstantin Igumnov. By the 1930s, he had become one of the most prominent Russian concert pianists. He mainly performed Romantic music, although he also played some works by contemporary Russian composers Dmitry Kabalevsky, Dmitri Shostakovich, German Galynin, Sergei Prokofiev and Rodion Shchedrin.

He taught piano for many years at the Moscow Conservatory from 1936. His notable students include Rodion Shchedrin, Viktoria Postnikova, Mikhail Pletnev, Lev Vlassenko, Natasha Vlassenko, Tatiana Ryumina, Mikhaïl Faerman, Bella Davidovich, Sergey Musaelyan, Regina Shamvili, Shoshana Rudiakov, Mikhail Rudy, Mark Zeltser, Vladimir Feltsman, Samvel Alumian, Mūza Rubackytė, Ilze Graubina, and Arnis Zandmanis.

He was a contemporary of, and sometime rival to Emil Gilels. In the 1960s and 1970s, Flier began to perform in Europe. During his concert tour in the USA he performed Sergei Rachmaninoff's Third Piano Concerto with the New York Philharmonic conducted by Leonard Bernstein.

He died in 1977 in Moscow, aged 65.

Awards
Flier was awarded People's Artist of the USSR in 1966.
Flier won the National USSR piano competition, The Vienna International Competition (1936) and The Eugene Ysaÿe Brussels International Competition (1938).

References

External links
 Audio links

1912 births
1977 deaths
People from Orekhovo-Zuyevo
Russian Jews
Jewish classical pianists
Russian classical pianists
Male classical pianists
Prize-winners of the Queen Elisabeth Competition
People's Artists of the USSR
20th-century classical pianists
20th-century classical musicians
Soviet classical pianists
20th-century Russian male musicians
Burials at Kuntsevo Cemetery